Korotkevich is a gender-neutral Slavic surname that may refer to
Gennady Korotkevich (born 1994), Belarusian sport programmer 
Haritina Korotkevich, (1882–1908), Russian soldier and heroine
Larisa Korotkevich (born 1967), Russian discus thrower 
Uladzimir Karatkievich (1930–1984), Belarusian romantic writer
Yevgeny Korotkevich (1918–1994), Soviet scientist and polar explorer